Kartal Anatolian High School is a selective-entry Anatolian High School in the Kartal district of Istanbul, Turkey. 

The school was founded in 1985 originally to serve the children of Turkish families that had lived in Germany. Its premises have a capacity of 500 students.
Entry to the school requires passing the national LGS (Liseye Geçiş Sınavı) tests for high school admission with a result within a specific percentile that is set annually. 

The school offers 4 years of standard education and a year of preparation for new students in language. 
The language of instruction is Turkish. Courses in English and German as foreign languages are offered, including for the German B1 and C1 certificate examinations. 

The school magazine Gençkal includes contributions from students.

References

High schools in Istanbul
Educational institutions established in 1989
1989 establishments in Turkey
Kartal
Anatolian High Schools